Powell Mountain is a summit in the U.S. state of Nevada.

Powell Mountain was named after A. Powell, a businessperson in the local mining industry.

References

Mountains of Mineral County, Nevada